Cortes (also known as Huertas) is an administrative ward (barrio) of Madrid belonging to the district of Centro.

Wards of Madrid
Centro (Madrid)